Serra Malagueta is a settlement in the northwestcentral part of the island of Santiago, Cape Verde. It is part of the municipality of Santa Catarina. In 2010 its population was 572. The main village, Locotano, sits at about 800 m elevation, northwest of the summit of Serra Malagueta, and lies partly in the Serra Malagueta Natural Park.

References

Villages and settlements in Santiago, Cape Verde
Santa Catarina, Cape Verde